Solar power in Arkansas on rooftops can provide 33.3% of all electricity used in Arkansas from 12,200 MW of solar panels.

Net metering is available to all residential consumers up to 25 kW and 300 kW for non-residential users, but is lost once a year at the end of the 12 month billing cycle, which needs to be in the spring to avoid losing excess summer generation. IREC best practices, based on experience, recommends no limits to net metering, individual or aggregate, and perpetual roll over of kWh credits. A rebate program is available for systems up to 25 kW that pays $1.50/kWh generated during the first year of operation. A 5 kW system, costing $17,500 after receiving a 30% federal tax credit, would produce about 6484 kWh/year, providing a rebate of approximately $9,726. The federal tax credit is available through 2021. In 2010 the Fayetteville Public Library installed a 13.5 kW solar array, and received a rebate for the 20,547 kWh generated of $30,821.10.

The largest company in Arkansas, and occasionally the world, Walmart, set a goal in 2005 of being powered 100% by renewable energy. By April 2012 they were generating 4% locally, mainly from rooftop solar panels, and overall using 22% renewable energy.

Statistics

See also
Wind power in Arkansas
Solar power in the United States
Renewable energy in the United States

References

External links
 Incentives and policies
 Arkansas Solar Installations
 Arkansas Renewable Energy Guide

Arkansas
Energy in Arkansas